Feng Qingbo (born 12 December 1974) is a Chinese speed skater. He competed in the men's 1500 metres event at the 1998 Winter Olympics.

References

External links
 
 
 

1974 births
Living people
Chinese male speed skaters
Olympic speed skaters of China
Speed skaters at the 1998 Winter Olympics
Place of birth missing (living people)
Speed skaters at the 1990 Asian Winter Games
Speed skaters at the 1996 Asian Winter Games
20th-century Chinese people